The Kamnik Bistrica is an Alpine river in northern Slovenia, a left tributary of the Sava River. It springs from the Kamnik Alps (part of the Southern Limestone Alps) near the border with Austria. The Kamnik Bistrica flows through the town of Kamnik, where it is fed by the Nevljica River. It flows into the Sava south of Videm, about 10 km east of Ljubljana.

References

External links

Condition of the Kamnik Bistrica - graphs, in the following order, of water level, flow and temperature data for the past 30 days (taken in Kamnik, downstream from the confluence with Nevljica by ARSO)

 
Rivers of Upper Carniola